Girls' Generation is the self-titled debut Japanese album and third overall by South Korean girl group Girls' Generation, released by Nayutawave Records and Universal Music Japan on June 1, 2011. A repackaged edition of the album, The Boys, was released on December 28, 2011.

To promote the album, Girls' Generation embarked on their first Japan concert tour, The First Japan Arena Tour. Furthermore, the album is also ranked 18th on Spin magazine's Top 20 Pop Albums of 2011, and makes Girls' Generation the highest selling album and the highest annually ranked album achieved so far by a Korean group in Oricon history.

With the aid of their repackaged album, the album has officially shipped over 1 million copies as of January 11, 2012. As of June 2012, the album has been "Million"-certified by the Recording Industry Association of Japan (RIAJ), making the group the second Korean artist and first Korean group to earn this achievement in Japan since Korean labelmate BoA's Best of Soul in 2005.

Background and release
After releasing three singles in the Japanese market, including "Genie", "Gee", and "Mr. Taxi/Run Devil Run", Girls' Generation released their first Japanese studio album Girls' Generation on June 1, 2011.

A music video for the track "Bad Girl" was released on August 11. Other tracks in the album, "Mr. Taxi" and "Let It Rain", were used as the background music for various versions of Girls' Generation's CF with Lipton Tea. Girls' Generation became the highest earning foreign artist in Japan for the first half of 2011.

On December 28, the group released a repackaged version of the album, Re:package Album "Girls' Generation" ~The Boys~. It includes a Japanese version of their international hit "The Boys", and remixed versions of "The Great Escape", "Bad Girl", "Mr.Taxi", and a new song "Time Machine". A music video for "Time Machine" was released on March 13, 2012.

Promotion
It was announced on March 7, 2011, that Girls' Generation would embark on their first nationwide Japan tour starting May 18, 2011 at Yoyogi National Stadium in Tokyo, with a total of 7 stops in Tokyo, Nagoya, Osaka and Fukuoka. The start of the tour was postponed to May 31, 2011, because of the 2011 Tōhoku earthquake and tsunami. Due to overwhelming demand, with up to 300,000 applicants applying for tickets, additional stops were added to the tour. The tour was named as The First Japan Arena Tour.

Critical reception

Girls' Generation received mixed to positive reviews from music critics. James Hadfield writing for the Japan edition of Time Out lauded it as a "cohesive" album and regarded the record as an "improvement" on the group's previous Korean releases. Hadfield also labelled Girls' Generation one of the best J-pop albums.

Spins editor Chuck Eddy picked "Bad Girl" as a highlight on the album, calling it "over-the-top" and "Latin-freestyle-emoted" track. Writing for the same magazine, Charles Aaron ranked Girls' Generation number 18 on Spins list of 20 Best Pop Albums of 2011; he praised the record as a collection of "over terrifyingly sophisticated dance tracks" and chose "Run Devil Run" as a standout.

Commercial performance
Pre-orders started on different e-stores. On Amazon Japan, the deluxe edition sold very well and rose quickly to No.1 on the pre-order chart while the limited edition was ranked 7th. On various Japanese album stores, Girls' Generation was the No.1 pre-ordered album with over 300,000 units expected to be shipped.

The album topped the Oricon Daily Album Chart at first place on June 1 with a sales count of 74,000 copies, which made Girls' Generation the first foreign girl group ever to top the chart on the release date. According to Oricon, the album sold 232,000 copies in the first week and placed first on the Oricon Weekly Album Chart, surpassing the record for first week debut album sales for a foreign artist, a record previously held by SM Entertainment labelmate BoA's Listen to My Heart. One month after the album release, Oricon reported a total sales of 250,000 copies. The album placed second on the Oricon Monthly Album Chart for the month of June and became the 5th best selling album of 2011 in Japan according to the Oricon Album Rankings.

On December 19, 2011, Oricon reported that Girls' Generation sold over 642,054 copies in the 2011 calendar year to rank 5th place on the Oricon Yearly Album Chart. This surpassed the previous record of 7th place and 569,530 copies sold by SM Entertainment labelmate TVXQ's Best Selection 2010, and makes Girls' Generation the highest selling album and the highest annually ranked album achieved so far by a Korean group in Oricon history. On June 8, 2012, the RIAJ certified the album "Million" for shipping over a million copies.

The album placed 5th on the Oricon Weekly CD Albums chart for the second week of January 2012, and Oricon announced that it was the first time in history that an album by a Korean artist placed in the Top 10 for 17 weeks. The previous record holder was the original soundtrack for the Korean drama Winter Sonata, which remained in the Top 10 for 16 weeks.

Editions
The album was originally released in three different editions: Deluxe Limited First Press Edition, Limited Pressing Edition, and the Regular Edition. A repackaged Edition was released later.
 Deluxe Limited First Press Edition comes with a bonus DVD featuring "Mr. Taxi"'s original and dance versions of the music video, plus "Genie" and "Gee" Japanese music videos, a 40-page photobook, a mini bag that comes in a special box.
 Limited Pressing Edition comes in a slipcase with a 32-page photobook and a bonus DVD featuring the same contents at the Deluxe Limited First Press Edition except "Mr. Taxi"'s dance version.
 Regular Edition comes in a standard jewel case with a lyrics-only booklet.

The album was later re-released as Re:package Album "Girls' Generation" ~The Boys~ was released in three editions: a Regular Edition with a lyrics-only booklet, a Limited Edition with a 36-page photobook, a bonus DVD featuring music videos of "Bad Girl" and "The Boys" (English Version) plus two rubber coasters and a Limited Pressing with the same photobook, bonus DVD and a case from the limited edition, but with two B2-size posters.

Singles
"Genie" is the official title for the debut in Japanese. The single was the first ever Japanese single released by Girls' Generation on September 8, 2010, in Japan. A new version of the music video was filmed to accompany the Japanese version, and the teaser was released on August 19, 2010. On August 26, 2010, the full music video was released. The song reached #5 on Oricon Charts on the releasing day. The song reached #2 on September 11, 2010. The song was released in three editions, two CD+DVD (first press and regular), and a CD Only edition. First press CD+DVD edition includes a special photobook and a random (1 of 9) photocard. The single includes also includes the Korean version, "Tell Me Your Wish (Genie)".

Girls' Generation also had success in Japan with their second Japanese single "Gee". They took second place and were crowned the first ever overseas girl group to reach number 1 on the chart. The song was ranked fifty-seventh on the Japan Hot 100 2010 year-end chart. On April 20, 2011, the girls added another accomplishment to their belt as the RIAJ (Recording Industry Association of Japan) website updated their charts showing that SNSD's Chaku Uta Full (ringtones) downloads for "Gee" went Double Platinum. The RIAJ certifies Platinum as moving 250,000 units, so Double Platinum would mean that the girls had over 500,000 downloads for "Gee".

"Mr. Taxi / Run Devil Run" set a new record for Girls' Generation, being their first Japanese single to shift 100,000 units in its first week of release. Before they released the physical single, they released the Japanese version of "Run Devil Run" as a digital single on January 25, 2011. The single also managed to clinch the number 1 spot on Billboard's Japan Hot 100 chart for two consecutive weeks. "Mr. Taxi" was first performed live on May 13, 2011, on TV Asahi's Music Station. On May 25, "Mr. Taxi" topped the Taiwanese music chart Gmusic.

Track listing
Credits adapted from Naver

Charts

Weekly charts

Year-end charts

Certifications

Release history

References

External links
Promotional music videos for the album:
 
 

2011 debut albums
Girls' Generation albums
Universal Music Japan albums
SM Entertainment albums
Japanese-language albums